Deep Sea Skiving is the debut studio album by British vocal group Bananarama, released in 1983. The album peaked at number seven on the UK Albums Chart and was certified Silver by the BPI.

The inner-sleeve of the vinyl release contained numerous photos of the group, several of them in childhood. These pictures were reproduced in the 2013 Deluxe Edition CD/DVD re-issue.

On 19 March 2007, Bananarama's first six studio albums (including Deep Sea Skiving) were re-issued by Rhino Records. All tracks on Deep Sea Skiving were remastered and it included several bonus tracks, consisting of B-sides, remixes and a cover of the Sex Pistols song "No Feelings".

Background and recording
Two of the album's tracks, "Really Saying Something" and "Aie a Mwana", were drawn from previously recorded singles. Bananarama recorded three tracks ("Shy Boy", "Na Na Hey Hey (Kiss Him Goodbye)", and "Boy Trouble") with Jolley & Swain producing, but dismissed the duo in the middle of the album's recording and recruited Barry Blue to produce the rest of the album. Siobhan Fahey explained, "[Jolley & Swain] wanted us to do their songs, not ours. They wanted a 1980s version of the old girl groups, disembodied voices. They didn't see us as voices with ideas." Despite this, Jolley & Swain would be brought back as producers for Bananarama's next two albums.

Track listing
Standard edition
"Shy Boy" – 3:16  (Steve Jolley, Tony Swain) produced by Steve Jolley and Tony Swain
"Doctor Love" – 3:42  (Paul Weller) produced by Barry Blue
"What a Shambles" – 3:34  (Sara Dallin, Siobhan Fahey, Keren Woodward, Terry Sharpe) produced by Barry Blue
"Really Saying Something" – 2:45  (Norman Whitfield, William "Mickey" Stevenson, Edward Holland Jr.) produced by Dave Jordan
"Cheers Then" – 3:31  (Sara Dallin, Siobhan Fahey, Keren Woodward, Terry Sharpe, John Martin) produced by Barry Blue
"Aie a Mwana" – 3:36  (Jean Kluger, Daniel Vangarde, Joseph Avion) produced by Big John Martin and Little Paul Cook, remixed by John Luongo
"Young at Heart" – 3:13 (Sara Dallin, Siobhan Fahey, Keren Woodward, Robert Hodgens) produced by Barry Blue; piano arranged by John Martin
"Na Na Hey Hey (Kiss Him Goodbye)" – 3:30  (Gary DeCarlo, Dale Frashuer, Paul Leka) produced by Steve Jolley and Tony Swain
"Hey Young London" – 3:55  (Barry Blue, Stan Shaw, Sara Dallin, Siobhan Fahey, Keren Woodward) produced by Barry Blue
"Boy Trouble" – 3:14  (Sara Dallin, Siobhan Fahey, Keren Woodward) produced by Steve Jolley and Tony Swain
"Wish You Were Here" – 3:41  (Sara Dallin, Siobhan Fahey, Keren Woodward) produced by Barry Blue

(Note : the original US LP omits "Aie a Mwana", and has a slightly altered running order.)

Japanese version
 "He's Got Tact" – 2:57 (Sara Dallin, Siobhan Fahey, Keren Woodward)

2007 CD re-issue bonus tracks
"Give Us Back Our Cheap Fares" – 4:24  (Sara Dallin, Siobhan Fahey, Keren Woodward, Vaughn Cotillard) 
"Girl About Town" – 3:28  (Sara Dallin, Siobhan Fahey, Keren Woodward) 
"He's Got Tact" – 2:57  (Sara Dallin, Siobhan Fahey, Keren Woodward) 
"Tell Tale Signs" – 3:08  (Sara Dallin, Siobhan Fahey, Keren Woodward) 
"No Feelings" – 2:33  (Paul Cook, Steve Jones, Glen Matlock, Johnny Rotten) 

Notes
The version of "Give Us Back Our Cheap Fares" used is the Extended Version.
The version of "Girl About Town" used is a slightly longer version with an additional 4 bars just before the instrumental break (roughly 1:45 – 1:59) than the original vinyl 7" version (3:10).

2013 Deluxe Edition CD/DVD re-issue

Disc 1
"He's Got Tact" – 2:59
"Girl About Town" – 3:13
"Tell Tale Signs" – 3:15
"No Feelings" – 2:33
"Aie a Mwana" (Extended Version) – 5:45
"Really Saying Something" (Extended Version) – 5:39
"Shy Boy" (12" Mix) – 5:50
"Cheers Then" (Extended Version) – 5:18
"Na Na Hey Hey (Kiss Him Goodbye)" (12" Version) – 4:52

Disc 2
"Aie a Mwana" (7" Version) – 3:48
"Really Saying Something" (U.S. 7" Mix) – 3:46
"Shy Boy" (U.S. 7" Mix) – 3:35
"No Feelings" (Alternative Mix) 2:35
"Give Us Back Our Cheap Fares" – 2:45
"Boy Trouble" (Extended Version) – 4:20
"Girl About Town" (Extended Version) – 5:31
"Tell Tale Signs" (Extended Version) – 4:45
"Aie a Mwana" (U.S. Extended Version) – 6:45
"Really Saying Something" (U.S. Extended Version) – 7:54
"Shy Boy" (U.S. Extended Version) – 7:20
"Give Us Back Our Cheap Fares" (Extended Version) – 4:23
"Aie a Mwana" (U.S. Dub) – 4:38
"Shy Boy" (U.S. Dub) – 9:23
"Na Na Hey Hey (Kiss Him Goodbye) (Na Dub Hey) – 4:12
"Aie a Mwana" (Dubwana) – 3:40

DVD
"Really Saying Something" – Directed by Midge Ure & Chris Cross
"Shy Boy" – Directed by Midge Ure & Chris Cross
"Cheers Then" – Directed by Keith "Keef" MacMillan
"Na Na Hey Hey (Kiss Him Goodbye)" – Directed by Keith "Keef" MacMillan
"Really Saying Something" – performance on Top of the Pops
"Shy Boy" – performance on 6.55 Special
"Boy Trouble" – performance on 6.55 Special
"Na Na Hey Hey (Kiss Him Goodbye)" – performance on Saturday Superstore

Personnel
Bananarama
Sara Dallin – vocals
Siobhan Fahey – vocals
Keren Woodward – vocals
Technical
John Mackswith, Squid Palmer – engineer
Peter Barrett – design
Bay Hippisley – photography

Charts

References

Bananarama albums
1983 debut albums
Albums produced by Jolley & Swain
London Records albums